Ptychocroca is a genus of moths belonging to the family Tortricidae.

Species
Ptychocroca apenicillia Brown & Razowski, 2003
Ptychocroca crocoptycha (Meyrick, 1931)
Ptychocroca galenia (Razowski, 1999)
Ptychocroca keelioides Brown & Razowski, 2003
Ptychocroca lineabasalis Brown & Razowski, 2003
Ptychocroca nigropenicillia Brown & Razowski, 2003
Ptychocroca simplex Brown & Razowski, 2003
Ptychocroca wilkinsonii (Butler, 1883)

Etymology
The generic name is an anagram of the specific name crocoptycha.

See also
List of Tortricidae genera

References

 , 2003, Zootaxa 303: 1-31

External links
tortricidae.com

Euliini
Tortricidae genera